"The Seven Wonders" is the thirteenth and final episode of the third season of the anthology television series American Horror Story, which premiered on January 29, 2014, on the cable network FX. The episode was written by Douglas Petrie and directed by Alfonso Gomez-Rejon.

In the episode, the remaining witches compete to perform the Seven Wonders in order to find out who is the next Supreme. After the new Supreme rises, the Coven goes public with their powers. Stevie Nicks guest stars as herself at the beginning of the episode, singing "Seven Wonders" as the girls prepare.

Plot
Zoe, Madison, Misty, and Queenie undergo the test of the Seven Wonders. At first, the girls pass each test, until they reach descensum, where they must send their spirits to hell and return before sunrise. All pass except Misty, whose spirit remains trapped in her own personal hell. Next is the act of transmutation. Zoe impales herself on the iron gates of the Academy, resulting in her death. Queenie fails at resurrection, while Madison refuses to bring Zoe back to life. Myrtle convinces Cordelia to attempt the Seven Wonders, and she completes them all successfully, while Madison fails at divination. Cordelia resurrects Zoe and is crowned the new Supreme. 

Kyle kills Madison for refusing to resurrect Zoe and Spalding takes her body. As the new Supreme, Cordelia decides to go public with the presence of the Coven. Myrtle insists on being burned at the stake for harming the council. Hundreds of girls are shown outside the gates as Cordelia appoints Queenie and Zoe to members of the Council and makes peace with her dying mother after inheriting her powers and title of Supreme, marking a new beginning in the history of the Coven.

Reception
Rotten Tomatoes reports a 62% approval rating, based on 13 reviews. The critical consensus reads, ""The Seven Wonders" doesn't quite deliver the payoff viewers might have hoped for, but it does curb the season's downward slope with a decently entertaining and visually impressive finale." Matt Fowler from IGN gave the episode a rating of 8.0, adding, "There were still a few head-scratching moments, but essentially "The Seven Wonders" put a bow on the season – with the few remaining villains getting their just desserts." Emily VanDerWerff of The A.V. Club rated the episode a C−, stating, "It seemed beyond the writers on Coven, who revealed in "The Seven Wonders" that they were similarly incapable of getting us interested in the actual end games of all of these characters."

The episode received a 2.2 18–49 ratings share and was watched by 4.24 million viewers in its original American broadcast, a marked increase from the previous episode. This episode had the most viewers of any finale in the entire series.

References

External links

 
 "The Seven Wonders" at TV Guide.com

2014 American television episodes
American Horror Story: Coven episodes
Fleetwood Mac
Television episodes set in hell
Stevie Nicks